Phasmasaurus tillieri, commonly known as Tillier's maquis skink, is a species of lizard in the family Scincidae. It is endemic to New Caledonia.

Etymology
The specific name, tillieri, is in honor of French zoologist Simon Tillier.

Geographic range
P. tillieri is found in southern New Caledonia.

Habitat

Description
The tail is extremely long, up to three times SVL. The limbs and digits are well-developed.

Reproduction
The mode of reproduction of P. tillieri is not known.

References

Further reading
Bauer AM, Sadlier RA (1993). "Systematics, biogeography and conservation of the lizards of New Caledonia". Biodiversity Letters 1: 107–122. (Lioscincus tillieri, new combination).
Ineich I, Sadlier RA (1991). "A new species of scincid lizard from New Caledonia, South Pacific Ocean (Reptilia: Lacertilia: Scincidae)". Mémoires du Muséum National D'Histoire Naturelle, Série A Zoologie 149: 343–348. (Leiolopisma tillieri, new species).
Sadlier RA, Bauer AM, Shea GM, Smith SA (2015). "Taxonomic resolution to the problem of polyphyly in the New Caledonian scincid lizard genus Lioscincus (Squamata: Scincidae)". Records of the Australian Museum 67 (7): 207–224. (Phasmasaurus tillieri, new combination).

Phasmasaurus
Reptiles described in 1991
Skinks of New Caledonia
Endemic fauna of New Caledonia
Taxa named by Ivan Ineich
Taxa named by Ross Allen Sadlier